The Cook County, Illinois, general election was held on November 6, 2012.

Primaries were held March 20, 2012.

Elections were held for Clerk of the Circuit Court, Recorder of Deeds, State's Attorney, all three seats on the Board of Review, three seats on the Water Reclamation District Board, and judgeships on the Circuit Court of Cook County.

Election information
2012 was a presidential election year in the United States. The primaries and general elections for Cook County races coincided with those for federal races (President and House) and those for state elections.

Voter turnout
Voter turnout in Cook County during the primaries was 24.03%, with 644,701 ballots cast. Among these, 440,873 Democratic, 200,750 Republican, 112 Green, and 2,966 nonpartisan primary ballots were cast. The city of Chicago saw 24.46% turnout, its lowest turnout for a presidential primary on record (with the records dating back to 1942). Suburban Cook County saw 23.63% turnout.

The general election saw 70.59% turnout, with 2,030,563 ballots cast. Chicago saw 73.01% turnout and suburban Cook County saw 70.70% turnout.

Clerk of the Circuit Court 

In the 2012 Clerk of the Circuit Court of Cook County election,  incumbent third-term Clerk Dorothy A. Brown, a Democrat, was reelected.

Primaries

Democratic

Republican
No candidates, ballot-certified or formal write-in, ran in the Republican primary. The Republican Party ultimately nominated Diane S. Shapiro.

General election

Recorder of Deeds 

In the 2012 Cook County Recorder of Deeds election,  incumbent Recorder of Deeds Eugene Moore, a Democrat, did not seek reelection. Moore had served as Recorder of Deeds since 1999. Karen Yarbrough was elected to succeed him.

Primaries

Democratic

Republican
No candidates, ballot-certified or formal write-in, ran in the Republican primary. The Republican Party ultimately nominated Sherri Griffith.

General election

State's Attorney 

In the 2012 Cook County State's Attorney election,  incumbent first-term State's Attorney Anita Alvarez, a Democrat, was reelected.

Only Democrats had held this office ever since Richard A. Devine unseated Republican Jack O'Malley in 1996.

Primaries

Democratic

Republican
No candidates, ballot-certified or formal write-in, ran in the Republican primary. The Republican Party ultimately nominated Lori S. Yokoyama.

General election

Cook County Board of Review

In the 2012 Cook County Board of Review election,  all three seats, two Democratic-held and one Republican-held, were up for election. All incumbents won reelection.

The Cook County Board of Review has its three seats rotate the length of terms. In a staggered fashion (in which no two seats have coinciding two-year terms), the seats rotate between two consecutive four-year terms and a two-year term. This was the first year since 2002 that all three seats were coincidingly up for election. 

As these were the first elections held following the 2010 United States Census, the seats faced redistricting before this election.

1st district

Incumbent first-term member Dan Patlak, a Republican first elected in 2010, was reelected. This election was to a four-year term.

Primaries

Democratic

Republican

General election

2nd district

Incumbent member Michael Cabonargi, a Democrat appointed in 2011 after Joseph Berrios resigned to assume office as Cook County Assessor, was reelected to a full term, running unopposed in both the Democratic primary and general election. This election was to a four-year term.

Primaries

Democratic

Republican
No candidates, ballot-certified or formal write-in, ran in the Republican primary.

General election

3rd district

Incumbent second-term member Larry Rogers, Jr., a Democrat, was reelected, running unopposed in both the Democratic primary and general election. Rogers had last been reelected in 2008. This election was to a two-year term.

Primaries

Democratic

Republican
No candidates, ballot-certified or formal write-in, ran in the Republican primary.

General election

Water Reclamation District Board 

In the 2012 Metropolitan Water Reclamation District of Greater Chicago election, three of the nine seats on the Metropolitan Water Reclamation District of Greater Chicago board were up for election in an at-large election.

Incumbent Democrats Debra Shore and Patricia Horton sought reelection. Horton failed to garner renomination, thus losing reelection.

Shore won reelection. Joining Shore in winning the general election were Democrats Kari K. Steele and Patrick Daley Thompson.

Primaries

Democratic

Republican

General election

Judicial elections 
12 judgeships on the Circuit Court of Cook County were up for partisan elections due to vacancies. 56 Circuit Court judgeships were up for retention elections.

23 subcircuit court judgeships were also up for partisan elections due to vacancies. Multiple subcircuit court judgeships were also up for retention elections.

Other elections 
Coinciding with the primaries, elections were held to elect both the Democratic and Republican committeemen for the wards of Chicago.

See also 

 2012 Illinois elections

References 

Cook County
Cook County, Illinois elections
Cook County 2012
Cook County